André Courrèges (9 March 1923 – 7 January 2016) was a French fashion designer. He was particularly known for his streamlined 1960s designs influenced by modernism and futurism, exploiting modern technology and new fabrics. Courrèges defined the go-go boot and along with Mary Quant, is one of the designers credited with inventing the miniskirt.

Early life 
Courrèges was born in the city of Pau within the Bearnese region of the Pyrenees. He wanted to pursue design in art school but his father, a butler disapproved his passion as he wanted him to be an engineer. Courrèges attended École Nationale des Ponts-et-Chaussées (École des ponts ParisTech). During World War II, he became a pilot for the French Air Force.

Career 

In 1945, at 25, after studying to be a civil engineer, Courrèges went to Paris to work at the fashion house Jeanne Lafaurie. A few months later, he went to work for Cristóbal Balenciaga.

Courrèges worked for Balenciaga for 10 years mastering the cut and construction of garments. In 1961, Courrèges launched his own fashion house. He became known for extremely simple, geometric, modern designs, including the "little white dress" and pants for women. They were often paired with low-heeled white ankle boots, a style that became known as the Courrèges boot, and evolved into the popular go-go boot. His clientele were mature and conservative woman with high disposable income. His designs style was shaped by Balenciaga with garments that were well sculpted for women.

Courrège's autumn 1964 collection evolved the fashion industry with modern, futuristic designs that were unheard of during the time. The collection included tailored tunics and trousers which were paired with his version of the miniskirt. "He paired his shorter skirts with white or colored leather, calf-high boots that added a confident flair to the ensemble. This look became one of the most important fashion developments of the decade and was widely copied."

Controversy over who created the idea for the miniskirt revolves around Courrèges and Mary Quant. He explicitly claimed to have invented, accusing his London rival to the claim, Mary Quant of merely "commercialising" it. Courrèges presented short skirts (four inches above the knee) in January 1965 for that year's Spring/Summer collection. He had presented "above-the-knee" skirts in the previous year, with his August 1964 haute couture presentation proclaimed the "best show seen so far" for that season by The New York Times. Valerie Steele has stated that Courrèges was designing short skirts as early as 1961, although she champions Quant's claim to have created the miniskirt first as being more convincingly supported by evidence. Others, such as Jess Cartner-Morley of The Guardian explicitly credit Courrèges with having invented the miniskirt. The Independent also stated that "Courreges was the inventor of the miniskirt: at least in his eyes and those of the French fashion fraternity ... The argument came down to high fashion vs street fashion and to France versus Britain – there's no conclusive evidence either way." Alongside short skirts, Courrèges was renowned for his trouser suits, cut-out backs and midriffs, all designed for a new type of athletic, active young woman. Steele has described Courrèges's work as a "brilliant couture version of youth fashion." One of Courrèges's most distinctive looks, a knit bodystocking with a gabardine miniskirt slung around the hips, was widely copied and plagiarised, much to his chagrin, and it would be 1967 before he again held a press showing for his work.

Courrèges's favoured materials included plastics such as vinyl and stretch fabrics like Lycra. While he preferred white and silver, he often used flashes of citrus colour, and the predominantly white designs in his August 1964 show were tempered with touches of his signature clear pink, a "bright stinging" green, various shades of brown from dark to pale, and poppy red.

In 1967 Courrèges married Coqueline Barrière, his design assistant. They had met while working together at Balenciaga, and worked together as a husband and wife team for the rest of his life.

In 1968 Courrèges sold a share of his company to L'Oréal in order to finance his expansion, which, by 1972, included 125 boutiques around the world. That year, Courrèges was commissioned to design staff uniforms for the Munich Olympics that year. He began offering menswear in 1973. He also developed fragrances such as Empreinte, Courrèges Homme, Eau de Courrèges, Courrèges Blue, Sweet Courrèges, and Generation Courrèges. In clothing, he remained devoted to the Space Age styles he had established during the 1960s, not changing his characteristic design features even as fashion changed during the 1970s. At the end of 1970s, Courrèges signed licensing agreements for lines of several garments, from shoes to towels.

In early 1983, Courrèges worked with the Japanese motor company Honda to design special editions of their TACT motor scooter. By 2005, Itokin held the Japanese ready-to-wear license for the Courrèges brand, with a retail value of €50 million. By this point, Madame Courrèges had succeeded her husband as artistic director for the brand, Courrèges having retired in 1995 following their successful reclamation of the brand in 1994 despite several ownership changes.

In 1984 Courrèges designed the Peugeot "Courrèges" bicycle, a limited edition model in two colourways – pale blue, and white with pink colour pops, and with matching panniers, chain guard, handlebar grips and mudguards, with Sturmey-Archer hub gears. 

In 2011 Andre and Coqueline Courrèges sold the Courrèges brand to two advertising executives, Jacques Bungert and Frédéric Torloting.

Space design
Courrège's Spring 1964 collection established his impact on the fashion industry and named him the Space Age designer. The line consisted of "architecturally-sculpted, double-breasted coats with contrasting trim, well-tailored, sleeveless or short-sleeved minidresses with dropped waistlines and detailed welt seaming, and tunics worn with hipster pants". A notable look was the linear minidresses with revolutionary tailoring with cut-out panels that displayed waists, midriffs and backs. Courrège had strong beliefs within the liberation of fashion. He emphasized that "A woman's body must be hard and free, not soft and harnessed. The harness – the girdle and bra – is the chain of the slave." Which is why his cut-out panel garments were worn without bras.

Accessories were inspired by astronauts' equipment such as goggles, helmets and flat boots. White and metallic colour ways were implemented to emphasise the futuristic collection. He utilised unconventional materials such as metal, plastic and PVC which was unusual for couture ateliers. The entire collection was celebrated with British Vogue announced that 1964 was "the year of Courrèges". The New York Times described him as "the brightest blaze of the year" to emphasise the change from the little black dress to the white dress. Designers such as Pierre Cardin and Paco Rabanne took influences towards "future" fashion looks. With new popularity, his designs trickled down to mass production companies that created affordable designs similar to Courrèges.

Later life and death
Courrèges suffered from Parkinson's disease for the last 30 years of his life. He died on 7 January 2016 aged 92, in his Neuilly-sur-Seine outside Paris and was survived by his wife and their daughter.

His death was published in notable media outlets and many designers went to celebrate his life online. President François Hollande went to Twitter to say, "A revolutionary designer, André Courrèges made his mark on haute couture using geometric shapes and new materials." Courrèges was a designer who looked to the future. He predicted the idea of healthy living and toned bodies through his book in 1982. Carla Sozzani, the owner of 10 Corso Como stated that, "It changed the concept of couture, marking the turn of fashion into a new era."

References

External links

Official website for moral and patrimonial rights

 

1923 births
2016 deaths
Deaths from Parkinson's disease
Neurological disease deaths in France
French fashion designers
Modernist designers
People from Pau, Pyrénées-Atlantiques
Shoe designers
French World War II pilots